The peso moneda corriente was a non-convertible Argentine paper currency which circulated between 9 January 1826, and 4 November 1881. Its symbol was $m/c. It was also known as the peso papel (paper money).

The peso moneda corriente was introduced at par with the peso fuerte ($F) but was devalued several times during its life. In the period from 3 January 1867 to 17 May 1876, the peso moneda corriente could be converted to gold, at the rate  25 = , in the Oficina de Cambios (exchange office) of the Banco de la Provincia de Buenos Aires. The office closed in 1876 because the people exchanged pesos for gold in large quantities. The peso moneda corriente was replaced by the peso moneda nacional at the rate of 25 pesos moneda corriente = 1 peso moneda nacional.

During the period the peso moneda corriente was in use, currencies from other countries were also used (especially the Bolivian boliviano).

External links
 Base de datos de Rodolfo Frank - El valor de la moneda (MS-Word document)

Peso moneda corriente
1826 establishments in Argentina
1881 disestablishments